Duke Jing of Qin (died 537 BC) was from 576 to 537 BC the eighteenth ruler of the Zhou Dynasty state of Qin that eventually united China to become the Qin Dynasty.  His ancestral name was Ying (嬴), and Duke Jing was his posthumous title.  Duke Jing succeeded his father Duke Huan of Qin, who died in 577 BC, as ruler of Qin.

Reign

In 562 BC, the State of Jin attacked the State of Zheng, which was then an ally of Qin and Chu.  In order to help Zheng, Qin attacked and defeated Jin at the Battle of Li (栎, in present-day Yongji, Shanxi).

Three years later, during the reign of Duke Dao of Jin, Jin led an alliance of 13 states to attack Qin.  The allied army set up camp after crossing the Jing River.  Qin poisoned the river from upstream, killing many soldiers of Jin and its allies, who were forced to retreat.  This event is known as the Battle of Qianyan (迁延之役).

In 537 BC Duke Jing died after 40 years of reign.  He was succeeded by his son, Duke Ai of Qin.

Tomb
In 1976, Duke Jing's tomb was discovered in Fengxiang County in Baoji, Shaanxi Province.  Yong, the long-time capital of Qin, was located in Fengxiang.  Archaeologists spent the next ten years excavating the tomb, the largest of the 43 Qin tombs discovered in Fengxiang.  Shaped like  an inverted pyramid, the tomb is as deep as an eight-story building and is the size of a palace.  It is the largest tomb ever excavated in China.

More than 180 coffins containing 186 human remains were found in the tomb, victims of funeral human sacrifice, a practice that was started in the state of Qin by Duke Wu in 678 BC and subsequently abolished by Duke Xian in 384 BC.  This is the largest number of human sacrifice victims discovered in a Chinese tomb dating from after the Western Zhou Dynasty.

References

Year of birth unknown
Rulers of Qin
6th-century BC Chinese monarchs
537 BC deaths